Merdeka Bridge or Jambatan Merdeka is a major bridge in Malaysia. It is situated in Jalan Butterworth-Sungai Petani (Federal Route ) at the Penang-Kedah Border on Muda River.

History
It was constructed between 1955 and 1957. The bridge was officially opened in 1957, when Malaya achieved its independence from Britain, hence its name. The bridge was initially a 2-lane single carriageway bridge before being duplicated on another side for Penang-bound traffic to increase traffic capacity.

Features
It is a concrete tied arch bridge.

References

Bridges completed in 1957
Bridges in Kedah
Bridges in Penang
Tied arch bridges